Torii Kiyotsune was a Japanese artist of the Torii school of ukiyo-e art.

Kiyotsune's birth and death dates are unknown; his personal name was Daijirō, and is believed to have been son of the publisher Nakajimaya Isaemon.  Kiyotsune's work appeared from the end of the Hōreki era (1751–1764) to the end of the An'ei era (1772–1781), a time of great productivity from the Torii school.  Kiyotsune produced yakusha-e portraits of kabuki actors with rounded linework in a style established by Kiyonobu II and Kiyomasu II.

His work is held in the permanent collections of many museums, including the Royal Ontario Museum, the Detroit Institute of Arts, the British Museum, the Harvard Art Museums, the Brooklyn Museum, the Metropolitan Museum of Art, the Los Angeles County Museum of Art, the Indianapolis Museum of Art, the Fine Arts Museum of San Francisco, the Honolulu Museum of Art, and the University of Michigan Museum of Art.

References

Works cited

External links
 
 Torii Kiyotsune at ukiyo-e.org

Torii school
Ukiyo-e artists
Year of birth unknown
Year of death unknown
18th-century Japanese artists
Japanese portrait artists